Cortez Ratima (born 22 March 2001) is a New Zealand rugby union player who plays for the  in Super Rugby. His playing position is halfback. He was named in the Chiefs squad for the 2022 Super Rugby Pacific season. He was also a member of the  2021 Bunnings NPC squad.

References

External links
itsrugby.co.uk profile

2001 births
New Zealand rugby union players
Living people
Rugby union scrum-halves
Waikato rugby union players
Chiefs (rugby union) players